Poppy Noor (born  1991) is a British columnist working for Guardian US. She has also written for other publications and appeared on television and radio news programmes. After a difficult childhood and a period of homelessness, Noor was admitted to Trinity College, Cambridge and after working in local government following her graduation, won a Scott Trust bursary for postgraduate study and became a Commissioning Editor for The Guardian Housing Network. Her journalism often features themes around race, social justice and community. Since late 2019 her role at Guardian US has a focus on "social news" in New York.

Career 
Noor grew up in an immigrant working-class family to an English mother and Bangladeshi father. Her early life  was spent in Plaistow, Newham. The family was "broke"; her mother experienced schizophrenia and her father worked long hours as a driver, later working as a car cleaner, and Noor and her two older brothers helped raise her four younger siblings; Noor has supported her family financially "for as long as (she) can remember". Noor was briefly taken into care, and left home at 16, sleeping on friend's sofas as she was not able to obtain her own accommodation due to not being recognised as officially homeless. After starting at a school in London Borough of Camden, Noor was referred to a homeless person's support team that provided bed and breakfast. She was later housed in a series of hostels.

Following good first-year results in her A-levels, Noor's tutors encouraged her to apply to the University of Cambridge, and she was offered a place at Trinity College, Cambridge, to study Politics, Psychology and Sociology. Noor wrote in The Times in 2016 that she found it hard to adjust to life at the university, stating that "I have never forgotten the intense alienation of my first night." Whilst at Trinity, Noor was awarded sporting colours for football.

After graduating, Noor worked in local government in East London. She trained as a social worker, before being awarded a Scott Trust bursary for a postgraduate degree at Goldsmiths, University of London and becoming a Commissioning Editor for The Guardian Housing Network. She also worked as a freelance journalist. Noor was a reporter in the London office of The Guardian before transferring, in late 2019 to a Guardian US role covering "social news" in New York and encompassing celebrity interviews.

Noor has also written for Vice, The Times, The Independent, The Psychologist and the British Medical Journal She has made several television appearances, including as a reporter for Channel 4 News in 2018. Her journalism often features themes around race, social justice and community.

Awards and nominations

Media appearances

References

External links
 The Guardian profile page

Living people
Alumni of the University of Cambridge
The Guardian journalists
British women columnists
English women journalists
British columnists
English journalists
Year of birth uncertain
Year of birth missing (living people)